Richard Crest (1930–2010) was a longtime member of the music department faculty at the College of San Mateo in San Mateo, California.

Life
After leading the college's concert band, Crest took over the leadership of the jazz band from Bud Young in the early 1960s.  The San Mateo College Jazz Band won the majority of California Jazz competitions. Crest invited a number of professional jazz musicians, including John Handy and Vince Guaraldi, to make appearances with the band, which performed in the college's little theatre.

Crest also led a professional band during the summer months at Rio Nido, California, on the Russian River, for evening concerts and dances in the village square, during the 1950s and 1960s. Richard also performed special events. One such memorable evening was at the Moscone Center. His band was the main event for the gala Christmas Party sponsored by TRW/ESL, Incorporated. He was the first director of a high school band playing at a National Football League game. He also directed the orchestra for the Democratic Party National Convention at the Moscone Center in 1984. He died in 2010 at the age of 80 and taught at James Lick High School.

Sources

American jazz bandleaders
People from San Mateo, California
2010 deaths
1930 births
Jazz musicians from California